Mohammed Alrotayyan, (Arabic: محمد الرطيان) is a Saudi journalist and novelist. In 1992, he started publishing in Saudi newspaper and Middle-Eastern newspapers. He also worked as a journalist for the Fawasil and Qutoof Magazines, and he has writings published in several publications. Generally, he is considered a public journalist with no affiliations to any political parties.

Career 
Alrotayyan has published newspaper articles, short stories and poetry in several newspapers. Currently, he publishes daily articles for the Saudi newspaper Al-Madina.

Alrotayyan was Saudi Arabia's representative in the Eighth Middle Eastern Festival for Poetry and Fiction. His name was listed as the best writer and poet in a survey conducted by the Kuwaiti Al-Mokhtalif magazine. Similarly, he appeared in Forbes as one of the 100 most influential Arabs. In 2018 rankings of Thought Leaders in the Arab world, Alrotayyan was on top of the list, which includes 112 figures. 

His short story Halil (Arabic: هليل) won him first place in the short story competition. In addition to that, his novel What's Left of Mohammad al-Touban's Papers (Arabic: ما تبقى من أوراق محمد الطوبان) won the Novel of the Year reward in 2010.

Works 
Books

 Book! (original title: Kitab!), 2008

 A Third Try (original title: Al-Mohawalah Al-Thalitha), 2011
 Comandments (original title: Wasayah), 2012
 Songs of the Blue Bird (original title: Aghani Al-Ousfor Al-Azraq), 2014
 Roznama, 2017
 Dao-daa, to be published

Novels

 What’s Left of Mohammad Al-Touban’s Papers (original title: Ma Tabaka min Awrak Mohammad Al-Touban), 2009

Poetry

Alrotayyan was invited to read his poems in many festivals, including:

 Al-Janadriyah National Festival
 Al-Qareen
 Al-Babteen

 Hala February
 The Saud bin-Bandr I Festival
 Jeddah 2000

References 

Saudi Arabian journalists
Saudi Arabian novelists
21st-century Saudi Arabian poets
Year of birth missing (living people)
Living people